Swiney is a surname. Notable people with the surname include:

C. C. Swiney (born 1981), American writer, actor and comedian
Erwin Swiney (born 1978), American football player
Frances Swiney (1847–1922), British feminist, writer and theosophist
George Swiney  (1793–1844), English physician and founder of the Swiney Prize
Tom Swiney (1875–1945), Australian politician

See also
Swiney Prize, awarded every five years for medical or general jurisprudence